36 Questions is a 2017 musical podcast by Two-Up Productions with music and lyrics by Chris Littler and Ellen Winter, with sound design by Joel Raabe. It follows the story of an estranged husband and wife trying to reconnect over the "36 Questions That Lead to Love", which were a part of a psychological study that explores intimacy. Released in three 50-minute acts, the three episodes were released by Two-Up Productions on July 10, July 24, and August 7, respectively, and it stars Jonathan Groff and Jessie Shelton.

Notable Casts

Musical Numbers

Characters 
 Judith Ford (Natalie Cook) – Jase's estranged wife, who lied about her name when she met Jase, using the name Natalie Cook, which she used throughout the two years of their relationship. Despite lying about her identity, she loves Jase and attempts to save their relationship by using the 36 Questions.
 Jase Connolly – Judith's estranged husband, who was under the impression that Judith was called Natalie Cook for their entire relationship. After finding out that 'Natalie' was actually called Judith and had faked her identity for the entirety of their relationship, he leaves without saying goodbye, leaving his wedding ring on the kitchen counter and going to his childhood home. He has two mothers and a brother.
Cooper Connolly – Cooper is Jase and his ex-girlfriend, Lisa's, son. He appears in the last scene between the songs "Attachment" and "The Truth" when Jase and Judith agree to meet up with each other at a restaurant. Cooper only has a speaking role and serves as physical proof of the rift between the two caused by time.
Henry – A duck that Jase grew an attachment for.

Plot

Act I 
The musical opens with a couple snapshots into the life of Natalie Cook and Jase Connolly, played back from Natalie's phone (as the entirety of the musical is framed from "the record"). This builds up to a record opening with "Natalie" in her car in the middle of a storm, disclosing that her real name is Judith Ford and that she's been lying to her now-estranged husband since the moment they met. She also notes that she left her phone charger at Denny's. She approaches Jase's childhood home, suspecting he must be there.

Judith talks to him as if he's a stranger standing on the other side of the door, telling him the strides she went through to get to the house and telling him that he should hear her out so he can know who he's trying to let go. ("Hear Me Out")

After hearing Judith complain about mosquitoes, Jase opens the door and lets her inside. She comes inside (after getting hit by a tarp) to hear a drill, a duck, and Jase talking to someone named Henry. Jase gets progressively frustrated as he argues with Judith about her finding his location and her dishonesty throughout their marriage. Judith evades most of the conversation by bringing up Henry the duck, but does admit to being self-aware of her faults. She then goes on to explain that she's only there for one thing, as the house falls apart around them.

Jase admits that he's also there for one thing: to forget about Judith. But he finds that it turns into a maintenance job as the house is deteriorating and is fostering black mold. He also admits that his attempts to fix the house were also making everything worse. ("One Thing")

Judith eventually convinces him to cooperate, and the record cuts out.

The record picks back up a few moments later, with Jase opening a folder and pulling out a book of matches and his wedding band. Judith jumps at the opportunity to mention that he left the latter on the table before abandoning her. He also pulls out a document containing the 36 Questions and mentions that they did the Questions the first time they fell in love. Judith presents to him every document she forged to become Natalie Cook, sets them in a trash, sprays it with lighter fluid, and proposes that Jase sets "everything that is and was Natalie Cook" on fire in order to move on from her completely. Jase, not understanding the value behind doing so, is uncooperative.

Judith continues to reason why they should set Natalie ablaze. Jase is unsure as to why that's his responsibility and states the only thing he wants is to know the truth; in turn, she explains that she was ashamed of the person she was when they first met, and saw the 36 Questions as an opportunity to live another life. Jase eventually gives in and sets the documents on fire. ("Natalie Cook")

After dumping the ashes out of a window, Jase comments that he now feels stupid because all of his estranged wife's identifying documents are gone. She proves him wrong by inviting him out to her car to show him that she has a passport with her real name on it. As they venture out to the car, Jase claims the entire ordeal is pointless. Judith challenges that by claiming it's an opportunity for them to meet and ask the 36 Questions properly, which leaves him dumbfounded since they're no longer strangers. After Judith shows Jase her passport, she offers to do the Questions, but he refuses. She persists and asks him Question 1, and eventually he gives in.

Jase begrudgingly answers that he'd have dinner with Judith, knowing fully well that she lied to his face. He claims it'd be an opportunity to learn why she lied to him and how she thought it was okay, and to get closure on the relationship before sending Judith out into the night. ("Judith Ford")

She answers that she'd also have dinner with him. The storm intensifies and they head back inside, greeted by a startled Henry. The two work together to calm him down, but to little success as the house continues falling apart. After the damage comes to a halt, Jase notes that he'll have to wait out the storm before anything can be fixed. Judith heads off to Jase's room to change clothes, leaving him with the record.

Over the course of the final song of Act 1, Jase admits that his cooperation is self destructive, but also admits that he still harbors feelings for her. Despite that, he claims that Judith's answers will remind him about how much she lied. She returns and asks for wine, so Jase heads off to find some. After talking to Henry for a bit, she blurts out that she wasn't expecting her plan to work so well. She also admits she's afraid of lying again, but equally detests disclosing the truth. Jase comes back and notices that she lit candles to make the mood "hopeful". She claims it's like their first date now – asking the Questions over 2 bottles of wine. Jase claims that it's different, as 2 years have gone by and his life is a lie. Over the climax of the song, they agree to do the questions. ("For the Record")

They tap their glasses together and the record cuts out, concluding Act 1.

Act II 
Act 2 opens with Judith starting a new record, mentioning that it's been about 8 minutes since the last one cut off due to her phone dying. She's in Jase's bedroom closet as it has the only working outlet in the house. They go over 2 more questions and Judith says some of the beginning answers are going to be the same. Jase, dissatisfied, insists to hear the Judith answers instead of the Natalie answers, claiming that he doesn't know anything about Judith.

Judith challenges that idea by listing things about her personality that never changed (i.e. she likes playing guitar and frequently leaves her card at the bar). They go over 5 more questions, correctly guessing each other's answers on a few of them. They reach Question 8, in which they're to name three things they seem to have in common. Judith and Jase both list 4 things, then continue listing things they have in common before calmly resolving on the idea that she was actually real around him. ("We Both")

Judith insists they get more wine, so Jase tries to give her directions to find it but she reminds him that she already knows. After Judith heads to the basement, Jase talks to Henry, admitting that he'd forgive her if she just apologized. The storm knocks the power out, so he goes down to the basement to check on Judith. Her phone battery is close to dying, and she insists they go to his truck to charge the phone. He refuses and they bicker as the record cuts off.

The record picks up again in the truck, with the two driving around as the phone charges. Judith finds a map of the local area and notes that there's an Applebee's, a motel, and a golf course nearby. She also mentions that they brought Henry. They do a few more questions before reaching Question 10, in which they're to disclose what they'd change about their upbringing. Jase states that Judith's answer last time was that she wished her parents were alive; then he suddenly realizes that her parents could still be alive, and Judith confirms that they are, regrettably. They stop at a light as Jase interrogates her about it, and Judith puts a stop to it by telling him to ask the question he's supposed to ask, so he does.

Judith reveals that her parents were pathological liars and raised her to be one as well. It affected her to the point that one day when she drowned and died for 3 minutes, she saw that her parents wouldn't hesitate to lie about her death. ("Our Word")

Jase pulls over to the side of the road and apologizes for her childhood. Judith brushes it off, but before Jase can get back on the road, Judith points out that they're beside the beach. Jase refuses to go, but Judith insists. He eventually gives in and leaves the truck with her, the record cutting out shortly afterwards.

The record picks up again with the two on the beach and Jase complaining about the not-so-ideal weather conditions. Judith prompts him to stick his head under her blazer if he's cold, and Jase, confused by the offer, says no. The record abruptly ends.

The record starts again with Judith asking Jase if he's comfortable under her blazer before moving on to Question 11, in which they're to take 4 minutes to tell their life story in as much detail as possible. Jase initially insists she doesn't need to hear his life story again, but he answers anyway. When Judith answers, she goes at a very rapid pace, skimming over a couple places she lived at before Jase interrupts, saying she's going too fast. Judith promises she's getting to the details of her life.

She opens up by saying her life really started when she met Jase, and that she was living a better life with him. A life that shattered when her parents tracked her down and Jase found out she lied about her identity, promptly leaving her without saying goodbye. ("A Better Version")

Judith, heartbroken, apologizes for what she's done. Jase impulsively kisses her, and the record ends.

Another record starts with them in the motel and Judith repeating the questions they answered as they were settling in. Their answers gradually become pointed, setting an awkward mood. Jase blurts out that it'd be easier to die than to tell everyone that Judith is back in the picture, so she asks if he's taking her back. Jase claims he's undecided, but Judith doesn't buy it and questions why he'd open the doors, burn her documents, and kiss her if he was undecided. Jase, not knowing how to answer, says he needs a break to check on Henry. Judith announces to the record that he picked up his truck keys, leading to an argument that ends with Jase shouting that he'll never be able to trust her again, and that it's just reality. She sarcastically says that the kiss on the beach wasn't reality, and Jase admits it was him wanting what he can't have. Judith insists he's the only thing in the way of what he wants, and Jase stays quiet.

Snapping out of the silence, Jase declares he has to leave Judith despite wanting his old life back, and the reality is that it can't happen. He admits that he loves her, but made a pact with his moms that he would never hear her out and wants to make his promise a reality. He then says that he deserves someone who accepts reality and he can't be strung along by Judith anymore. ("Reality")

On his way out the door, he tells her that he was blinded by his want to know the truth and that it was wrong of him to lead her on. Despite Judith claiming that he was finally understanding, he says goodbye and leaves. She begins sobbing and eventually pours herself a drink, somberly asking herself Question 19: "If you knew that in one year you would die suddenly, would you change anything about the way you are now living? Why?" The record ends.

Act III 
Act 3 opens up with Judith walking back to the house. She admits that she's frustrated, but wants to finish what she started, saying that Jase deserves to fully know the person he's walking away from. She turns the record off.

She turns on the record again, whispering that she's sneaking up on Jase. Despite startling him, she springs the next question on him. Jase, confused and frustrated, shouts that the motel is 10 miles from the house and tells her that he won't cooperate with her because he has to pick up his moms from the airport. Judith sits on his porch and shouts the next few questions and her answers to them; meanwhile, Jase rushes to get ready and dashes to the car. Judith calls him out for abandoning her again, but Jase claims he's officially late to pick up his moms. He tells her sternly that it's over before driving off, leaving Judith brokenhearted. She sits on his patio, going over the next 9 questions before she hears a sound and thinks it's Jase. She gets angry with herself for spending so much time worrying about him, but reminds herself to finish what she started. After answering the last 5 questions, she wonders how she'll let him go.

Over an instrumental reprise of Hear Me Out Judith gives herself a pep talk, saying it'll be strange to live without him, but that she deserves to let him go and build a better version on her own. She says that she loves Jase and she probably always will, and leaves her phone in his mailbox for him to find. ("Answer 36") The record shuts off.

The record picks up again briefly with Jase saying he'll put an end to her manipulation by throwing out the phone. Another two brief records play, with Jase unsure of what to do with the phone. Another plays, with Jase admitting that he's thinking of Judith, but has nobody to get it off his chest to, and finds comfort in talking to the record about it. He changes his mind and turns it off.

Another record starts, with Jase disclosing that it's 2010, and that he re-met his other ex-lover, Lisa Coolman. He goes on to admit that he listened back to the record and realized he still loves Judith too, before turning off the record. He turns it back on in 2015, mentioning that he's still dating Lisa and had a son, Cooper, with her. He tells the record that Lisa sprung the 36 Questions on him, which led to a conversation about his relationship with Judith and him leaving her 3 times. He goes on to admit that he heard himself leaving Judith all three times while trying to sleep, and listened back to the record, which left him feeling like a coward for running away. He turns off the record again, but turns it back on in 2017 to explain that he broke up with Lisa because they were "too similar". He has Cooper on weekdays and admits that his son asks a lot of questions that he doesn't know the answer to, so he lies about it to "make things move". He then goes on to admit that Judith was right to move on from him but he has to finish what he started. ("Listen Back") He turns off the record.

The record turns on moments later, saying that he found Judith's email and typed the remaining questions and answers in a three-page PDF.

Jase composes an email with the PDF attached while overthinking what could go wrong with Judith's reaction. After sending the email, he turns off the record. ("Attachment")

The record starts again with Jase reporting that Judith surprisingly responded and invited him to dinner at Applebee's to finish the 36 Questions exercise in person. Excitedly getting ready to plan for it, Jase turns off the record.

On the day of the meetup, Cooper accidentally turns on the record while playing with the phone. They head inside to meet Judith who introduces herself as Natalie. Jase returns her phone and goes over the remaining questions, ending with the same question she had: How can he let her go? She responds with some advice and they move on to the staring part, to which Cooper keeps interrupting, eventually asking why they're staring into each other's eyes. Jase says that looking into someone's eyes can help discern whether or not they're telling the truth, at least sometimes. Cooper asks why someone would lie, and Jase hesitates.

Jase admits that the truth can be hard to explain and depends on the person's point of view anyway, and that the truth doesn't have to be for the better or even true forever. They both come to the conclusion that two sides can both be right, and that the truth doesn't exist in black and white. They end on the recognition that they'll never really know the truth, they only know what they think they know of it. ("The Truth").

The record ends after a few seconds of silence, leaving the aftermath ambiguous.

Production 
Skip Bronkie and Zack Akers of Two-Up Productions, the same company behind Limetown, approached Littler and Winter with the parameters of the plot. Littler and Winter dismissed the podcast trope of having an external narrator early in the production process, deciding instead to loop the two singers' voices into harmonies to avoid the need for a chorus. In place of a narrator, each episode exists as a series of voice memos that Judith records on her phone.

Awards

Film adaptation 
In August 2020, it was announced that Netflix and Chernin Entertainment will adapt the podcast into a feature film, with Brett Haley to direct. The new script is said to be a collaborative effort between Haley and Marc Basch.

References

External links 
 

2017 musicals
2017 podcast debuts
2017 podcast endings
Scripted podcasts
Audio podcasts
Works about marriage
Works about interpersonal relationships
Works about psychology
Found footage fiction
Musical theatre podcasts